is the theme song to the film Zebraman 2: Attack on Zebra City, released as a CD single on April 21, 2010. The song is performed by actress Riisa Naka under the name , the character she portrays in the film. In the plot of the film, the song is said to have been the #1 song for 40 weeks straight during the year 2025. In real life, the single peaked at #22 on the Oricon Weekly Charts in 2010, remaining on the charts for 6 weeks. Naka states that she gave Zebra Queen a persona akin to Lady Gaga for the musical performances. In addition to these two music videos, an alternate music video for the B-Side was filmed featuring comedian Naomi Watanabe in place of Riisa Naka as Zebra Queen.

Track list
 - 3:21
Lyrics: Hidenori Tanaka, Emmy
Composition: Makoto Ogata, Noriki Ijiri
Arrangement: Masahiro Tobinai
 - 3:56
Lyrics: Kankurō Kudō
Composition & Arrangement: Masahiro Tobinai
"Namida (Kokoro Abaite) <Inst.>" - 3:21
"Zebra Queen no Thema <Inst.>" - 3:54

References

External links
Zebra Queen Official Website

2010 singles
2010 songs
Japanese film songs